The National Széchényi Library (OSZK) is a library in Budapest, Hungary, located in Buda Castle. It is one of two Hungarian national libraries, the other being University of Debrecen Library.

History
The library was founded in 1802 by the highly patriotic Hungarian aristocrat Count Ferenc Széchényi. Széchényi traveled the world buying Hungarian books, which he assembled and donated to the nation. In 1803, the public library was opened in Pest. Széchényi's example resulted in a nationwide movement of book donations to the library.

In 1808, the Hungarian National Assembly ("Diet") created the Hungarian National Museum to collect the historical, archaeological and natural relics of Hungary. The Museum was merged into the Library and for the last 200 years this is how it has existed, a national depository for written, printed and objective relics of the Hungarian past.

In 1846, the Hungarian National Museum moved into its new building but it was not until 1949 that the Library became a separate entity again, with its current name. In 1985, the library moved to its new home at the Buda Castle Palace. The NSZL works on its catalogue's semantic availability.

Directors
 1803–1815: Ferencánd Jaker Miller
 1815–1846: István Horvát
 1846–1875: Gábor Mátray
 1875–1879: Vilmos Fraknói
 1879–1893: Béla Majláth
 1893–1894: József Szinnyei
 1894–1919: Fejérpataky László
 1919–1922: János Melich
 1923: Bálint Hóman
 1924–1929: Imre Lukinich
 1930–1934: Emil Jakubovich
 1934–1945: József Fitz
 1945– 1946: József Györke
 1946–1947: Gábor Tolnai
 1948–1957: Béla Varjas
 1958–1966: Magda Jóború
 1966–1968: Géza Sebestyén
 1968–1982: Magda Jóború
 1982: Péter Zircz
 1982–1984: Ferenc Molnár
 1984–1986: Zoltán Havasi
 1985—1993: Gyula Juhász
 1993—1999: Géza Poprády
 1999—2009: István Monok
 2009—2013: Andrea Sajo (Katona)
 2013—2014: Péter Szemerei
 2014: János Káldos
 2014—2019: Dr. László Tüske
 2019—2020: Judit Hammerstien
 2020—: Dávid Rózsa

Collections
The library aims to collect "hungarica" which is describes as works published within Hungary, published in Hungarian, written by Hungarian authors, and those with Hungarian aspects. The library receives two copies of all publications and prints produced in Hungary.

Books 
The library's Incunabulum Collection consists of 1,800 books printed before 1500; notable items include a fragment of the Gutenberg Bible and the Chronica Hungarorum-the first book printed in Hungary. Its Antiqua Collection holds 13,000 items from the 16th-century, including a first edition of Nostradamus' The Prophecies. The Old Hungarian Library is a collection of 8,500 old Hungarian books including the Vizsoly Bible, the first complete Bible printed in Hungarian. The Apponyi Collection is a collection of over 3,000 Hungarian-related items donated by Count Albert Apponyi in 1924. One of its most notable items is the Tabula Hungariae, the earliest surviving printed map of Hungary. Other collections include the Leaflet Collection; Old Cyrillica Collection, mostly consisting of liturgical books written in Romanian Cyrillic, Early Printed Books Archive, and the History of Binding Collection.

Periodicals 
With the influx of periodicals in the 19th-century,  established the National Newspaper Library in 1884. The library has about 250,000 volumes of periodicals. Of the Hungarian and international newspaper collection, almost 75 percent of its items are the only surviving copies.

Manuscripts 
The library holds the largest manuscript collection in Hungary with about 1,400,000 total items. Notable items include the original copies of Himnusz, Hungary's national anthem, and Szózat, a Hungarian song.

Posters and Small Prints 
The Collection of Posters and Small Prints, established in 1935, holds about four million documents, making it one of the biggest collections of the library.

Maps 
In 1939, the Map Collection became an independent department of the National Széchényi Library. As of 2015, the map collection encompasses over 300,000 items, with 3,400 map sheets belonging to the original Széchényi-collection from the early 1800s. Approximately a quarter of the maps' coverage is of historical Hungary, and the remaining maps in the collection cover areas all over the world.

The library has been digitizing its map collection in recent years to make cultural heritage items more accessible. The library partnered with the Department of Cartography and Geoinformatics at Eötvös Loránd University to digitize some of the library's globes to create the Virtual Globes Museum. Tabula Hungariae, the first printed map of Hungary, is now digitized and accessible online.

Theatre History 
In 1949, the Theatre History Collection was established to take over the libraries of the theaters that remained after World War II. It holds 30,000 plays and 380,000 documents.

Music 
The library's music collection holds 170,000 items of printed sheet music. Notable items include Joseph Haydn's manuscripts and first edition works, items from Franz Liszt, and Ferenc Erkel's operas' manuscripts.

Photos 
The library's photo collection was established in 2007. Among other items, it holds 40,000 glass plates or photo and film negatives of the library's book collection.

Discovery of New Mozart Autograph
In 2014, a Hungarian librarian discovered four pages of Mozart's original score (autograph) of the sonata in Budapest's National Széchényi Library. Until then, only the last page of the autograph survived. The paper and handwriting of the four pages matched that of the final page of the score, held in Salzburg. Zoltán Kocsis gave the first performance of the discovered score in September 2014.

See also 
Codex of Bécs

References

Notes

Citations

External links

 Official Site
 Hungarian National Museum 
 Hungarian National Bibliography
 Humanities Studies and Articles Database (Humanus)
 Hungarian Electronic Library
 Electronic Periodicals Archive and Database
 Bibliotheca Corviniana Digitalis program (Matvin's Corvinas)
 The Historical Chronology of Hungary
 NEKTÁR Online Catalog Search

1802 establishments in the Habsburg monarchy
19th-century establishments in Hungary
Library buildings completed in 1846
Buda Castle
Buildings and structures in Budapest
Culture in Budapest
Education in Budapest
Libraries in Hungary
Hungary
Széchenyi family
Libraries established in 1802